The Sistema Brasileiro de Televisão (SBT ; "Brazilian Television System") is a Brazilian television network founded on Wednesday, 19 August 1981, by the businessman and television personality Silvio Santos. The company was established after a public tender by the Brazilian Federal Government to form two new networks, created from revoked concessions of the defunct Tupi and Excelsior networks. The SBT was funded in the same day that the concession agreement was signed, and that the act was broadcast live by the network, so that this was his first program aired. Before acquiring the concessions of the four station that were to form the SBT, Grupo Silvio Santos had since 1976 the concession of Rio de Janeiro's channel 11, known as TVS Rio de Janeiro (now SBT Rio), which was a fundamental step to give life to the SBT.

In April 2018, the SBT was the second-most watched television network in Brazil, behind Globo. Throughout its existence, the network always occupied the space in the audience ranking, except between 2007 and 2014, when the Record network took its place. The SBT has a total of 114 broadcast television stations (O&Os and affiliates) throughout the Brazilian territory, and is also available through pay television operators (cable and satellite), free-to-air signal on satellite receivers and also through streaming media in their mobile application (Android, iOS and Windows), applications for smart TVs and its website. Also on their website, its programming is available in video on demand for free, also available from the video-sharing site YouTube since 2010. In March 2017, the 43 channels of the SBT on YouTube accumulated 20 million subscribers and 70 billion minutes watched.

The SBT broadcasts their programming a wide variety of television genres, whereas its own material generally stand adjacent to the entertainment. Foreign programming, mainly the telenovelas produced by the networks owned by the Mexican conglomerate Televisa, are part of their program schedule. It is the only commercial television broadcaster in Brazil which airs children's programming, even arranging a partnership with The Walt Disney Company, in which the company provides two hours of daily programming for the network. The network also possess times for the television news, producing in all three daily newscasts, a weekly news program and a weekly newscast.

The network owns the CDT da Anhanguera, a television complex located at the kilometer 18 of the Rodovia Anhanguera, in Osasco, São Paulo, occupying an area of 231 thousand square meters. This is the third largest television complex in size installed in Latin America, being smaller only that the studios of TV Azteca, in Mexico, and the Estúdios Globo.

History

Before the SBT
Rede Tupi, the channel 4 in São Paulo, began operations in 1950. In 1962 (when he began his first TV program), Silvio Santos produced his own programs on Tupi, TV Paulista and on Rede Globo beginning in 1965. Soon enough, he started plans to have his own television channel. His production company, Estudios Silvio Santos Cinema e Televisao, was successful on Tupi, Globo and (since 1972) on RecordTV (where he then owned half of the company's stock).

In 1976, with help from humorist and friend Manoel de Nóbrega (who had a show on Rede Globo and was part of Bau de Felicidade), Santos obtained a license for his own station: Rio de Janeiro's channel 11, known as "TV Studios" or "TVS". Soon after its launch, its flagship program (Programa Silvio Santos on Sundays) plus the late night Silvio Santos Diferente on weekdays began to be broadcast (Santos left Globo the same year). Other programs soon began, as the network gained support from city residents who sought an alternative to Globo, Tupi, Bandeirantes and TV Rio (the city's network, related to TV Record along with TVS). The new channel debuted on 14 May 1976, with a logo of a gold circle with the number 11 slanted in gold, which featured in the first Scanimate idents and promos for the channel - making it a pioneer station in the country when it came to computer animation. While during its early years the network studios were based in Rio, all program production for TVS transferred to São Paulo in 1978–79.

When Rede Tupi went out of business in 1980, Santos obtained three stations from the network: the São Paulo's channel 4, the Porto Alegre's channel 5 and the Belém's channel 5. The SBT was created, launching on 19 August 1981, but using the TVS name until 1990 for some of its stations. Until the formation of the SBT, the Silvio Santos Group also had a station named TVS in Nova Friburgo, serving viewers in the northern and western parts of the state, this was also its first branch station, having opened in 1979.

In 1978, Minas Gerais' TV Alterosa became one of the SBT's broadcast-affiliate networks, the first affiliate station for the channel. Some later affiliates were adopted from Rede Tupi after its closure on 18 July 1980, by order of Brazilian Minister of Communications Haroldo de Matos, who the following year would order SBT to begin transmissions. When Tupi closed, Programa Silvio Santos moved to Record but continued simulcasting Sundays on the TVS Channels 11 and 3, as well as on yet another SS Group station - Channel 9, purchased from TV Continental.  Santos began the network's expansion efforts, convincing stations to become the SBT and Record affiliates. The official launch of the network on 19 August 1981, also marked the debut of its first presentation package using its famous circle logo (similar to the one used till today by the American Broadcasting Company) and dual branding (the SBT being the official name of the network while TVS being the station branding in its three founding stations), and it was the only network launch to be held in Brasilia and broadcast directly from the federal capital city. The first idents were similar to ABC's Still the One idents of 1979, used by the Nine Network in Australia in 1980.

The Matos decision also gave the network the Sumare studios of Tupi for drama production. By the time of the 1981 launch the SBT had 18 affiliate channels nationwide.

1980s

During the 1980s the SBT established itself, contracting popular hosts and airing a mix of its own and Televisa programming (especially Mexican telenovelas and comedy shows such as El Chavo del Ocho and El Chapulín Colorado). It climbed to second place in the Brazilian ratings (except in Rio de Janeiro, where Rede Manchete occupied that position). Moreover, it hosted the Brazilian version of Bozo for kids plus even let ex-Tupi program presenters bring their shows over to the fledgling network.

SBT, together with Record (under the SBT/Record pool) broadcast the 1984 Summer Olympics in Los Angeles, two years before its 1986 FIFA World Cup coverage.

1985 would see the SBT score a historic victory with the broadcast of the Australian miniseries The Thorn Birds, and TVS Channel 4 São Paulo became SBT Channel 4 São Paulo, thus becoming a truly national network with the introduction of satellite broadcasts.

In March 1986, the network premiered its new talk show, Hebe, with Hebe Camargo as host; the show was formerly on Rede Tupi and Rede Bandeirantes. It became one of the network's longest-running programs, running for over 24 years; the final show was at the end of 2010, when Camargo ended her contract. She had a spin-off show, Hebe por Elas (Hebe for All), during the early 1990s. The death of Flavio Cavacante, one of the network's pioneer presenters, just days after his 22 May episode of his own program shocked the nation so much that on the day of his funeral the network started transmissions only in the afternoon in his honor.

In 1987, Santos pursued a better-quality program lineup, while trying to attract a larger audience and better advertisers. During that year (in response to the high popularity of Rede Globo's Xou da Xuxa on weekdays), SBT began increasing its child-oriented programming with programs such as Oradukapeta, Show Maravilha and the Do Re Mi series. Nearly all SBT kids' programs had female presenters (different from the format of Xou da Xuxa), because Oradukapeta was hosted by Sergio Mallandro (also a Show de Calorous judge).

The network also launched its slogan "Quem procura, acha aqui", modeled on NBC's three-year "Be There" campaign project from 1983 to 1985. The slogan lasted for three seasons, with a new promo each year. The theme used each year corresponded to NBC's theme for its project:

 1983–1987: NBC's "Be There", with SBT's first installment of "Quem Procura Acha Aqui"
 1984–1988: NBC's first installment of "Let's All Be There", with SBT's second "Quem Procura Acha Aqui"
 1985–1989: NBC's second installment of "Let's All Be There", with SBT's third and final "Quem Procura Acha Aqui"

Even all program adverts were also modeled on the NBC ones, with the 1989-90 edition seeing the program talents saying the day the program will be aired followed by the phrase No SBT (On SBT) with the program time being shown, this style was carried on to 1990.

1987 also was the year that the network began to change its corporate branding from TVS to the SBT, and the 2nd year of its "QPAA" campaign resulted in the logo being relaunched, now with slanted colors on the circle (similar to ABC's 1987-88 logo and its "Something's Happening on ABC" campaign).

Humorist Jô Soares was brought in from TV Globo in 1988, introducing a late-night talk program to Brazilian TV with his 11:30 PM show entitled Jô Soares Onze e Meia. Also signed was Boris Casoy, who became the first news anchor in Brazil with his TJ Brasil newscast (which succeeded Noticentro, the network's first newscast with Antonio Casale) and ex-Balão Mágico member Simony.

In 1988, Santos prevented host "Gugu" Liberato from signing with Globo after Liberato hosted the SBT's big weekend hit Viva a Noite since 1986. This was widely seen as indicative that Gugu would be Santos' successor on Sunday afternoons, reinforced by the extended timeslot of Gugu's future program Domingo Legal. As a result, Programa Sílvio Santos adopted the dual-presenter format, with Gugu hosting segments such as the Brazilian version of Double Dare, called Passa ou Repassa (known for its "Torta na Cara" segment) and Cidade contra Cidade.

1990s
The TVS brand was merged into the SBT brand in 1990; the name change was seen in a new campaign ad modeled on NBC's "Come Home to NBC" campaign of 1986–87, which premiered early that year, and in August on TV station identifications celebrating SBT's ninth year of broadcasts (that year, Silvio Santos sold Record as a national network) and it also broadcast the 1990 FIFA World Cup. 1991 saw the beginning of its newscast Aqui Agora and Serginho Groisman's Programa Livre variety show, just a few of the many successes for the year even as the network's São Paulo studios suffered damages due to massive floods that hit the city. In 1992, the SBT and Rede Globo (together with Manchete, Band, and SporTV) jointly broadcast the 1992 Summer Olympics and the 1996 Summer Olympics (together with Manchete, Record, Band, SporTV, and ESPN) nationwide, with a grand advertising campaign for the Brazil national team. Despite problems and even the transfer of talents to other stations (such as the then resurgent Rede Record), the 90s proved to be a boom for the network, beginning its second decade with 74 affiliates, bigger when it signed on.

The SBT invested in its own telenovelas and remakes of successful ones from foreign networks (most notably Chiquititas), variety programs, news and current affairs, and broadcast rights for sporting events (including the Copa Mercosur, Copa do Brasil and Champ Car). It signed host Carlos "Ratinho" Massa in 1998, obtained more Mexican productions and launched game shows (such as Show do Milhão) in 1999. By the end of the decade the SBT held second place in the Brazilian ratings, after Globo, strengthed by a brand new and technologically advanced television complex, the CDT da Anhanguera, inaugurated in 1996, just in time for its 15th anniversary.

Ad campaigns

American and Australian imports
The 1990s were the SBT's most fruitful decade for American-style ad campaigns:
 1987–1990: NBC's second installment of "Come Home to NBC",  with "Vem Que é Bom" with the graphics of 1988's "Come Home to the Best, Only on NBC"
 1986–1991: NBC's first year of "Come Home", with "10 anos com você" (the 10th-anniversary slogan)
 1990–1991 and 1993–94: CBS's second year of "Get Ready for CBS" with "Se liga no SBT". On 20 January 1991, the Australian Network Ten launched "That's Entertainment" to coincide with a logo change, using in-house music and similar graphics
 1989–1992 and 1995: ABC's first year of "America's Watching ABC" became "Fique ligado no SBT". In 1992 Ten launched "This Is It" with its promo based on the music from "America's Watching", in a different key with different instrumentation and vocals.

Domestic campaigns
 In 1992, the one-minute spot "Aqui Tem" was launched for network-wide use. The promo featured an in-house soundtrack (with similarities to NBC's "Come Home to the Best, Only on NBC" campaign of 1988–89) and graphic elements from NBC's 1991 campaign, "The Place to Be".
 In August 1996 the SBT launched a new logo (replacing its multicoloured stripes with solid colours) and relaunched "QPAA" with a new slogan, "Tudo Pra Você", for its 15th anniversary.
 In 1997 the SBT made its new graphics based on ABC's 1996 campaign, Watched by More People.
 In 1998 the network released "A cara do Brasil", with new graphics and soundtrack.
 In 1999 the network produced "Na nossa frente, so você", with new graphics and music. The 64-second promo was used on-air for the first time in 2000; the slogan was used until 2004 with two songs composed for this. The 1st campaign spot (1999-2000) mirrored the Nine Network's 1997 promo spots but with an original soundtrack.

2000s
The SBT began the decade investing in movies, broadcasting a package of Disney (now affiliated with TV Globo) and Time Warner productions (the latter promoted in a one-hour network block). In 2001, the controversial reality show Casa dos Artistas, accused by many of being a copy of Endemol's Big Brother, marked the first time SBT led the Sunday-night ratings, aside from its Domingo Legal program becoming no.1 in the Sunday afternoon ratings.

Since 2003, with the ratings advances of RecordTV and Rede Bandeirantes, the SBT's ratings have declined. Two events that year marked the beginning of its problems:
 Early in the year Silvio Santos gave an interview with the TV-gossip magazine Contigo!, in which he stated that he was ill and had sold the SBT. Later, he claimed that this was intended as a joke.
 The "Gugu-PCC scandal": On September 7 Domingo Legal aired an interview with alleged members of the criminal group PCC, threatening the deputy mayor of São Paulo and the hosts of police reality programs on the competing TV Record and Rede TV! networks. Later, it was discovered that this was a hoax; the program was suspended for a week, its audience never recovered and Gugu Liberato (its host, once seen as Santos' successor) never regained his credibility.

Since then the SBT has aired the successful Rebelde and shows with child host Maisa Silva, who became popular; however, programs could change without previous announcement (even hosts were sometimes out of the loop), confusing the audience. In 2006 SBT celebrated its 25th anniversary in a deepening crisis.

The SBT is the second-largest network in the country, vying for leadership with Rede Record. The CDT da Anhanguera is the second-largest television-production center in Brazil, behind Projac (owned by Rede Globo). Over 5,000 employees work around the clock at the SBT's 110 TV stations.
In 2008 the network lost second place in the ratings to Record, but tied for second place the following year.
In 2009 Liberato moved to Record after more than 20 years with the SBT; at the same time, the SBT signed presenters Roberto Justus and Eliana from Record. It also appeared on SKY Brasil, the last of the five major Brazilian networks to do so.

Recent programs include What's Your Talent, a local combination of Britain's Got Talent and Show de Calouros (created and hosted by Silvio Santos during the 1970s); a Brazilian version of 1 vs. 100; an annual telethon, which raised R$19 million in 2009; Kyle XY; the reality show Solitary; Smallville, Grey's Anatomy and De Frente with Gabi, a talk show featuring journalist Marilia Gabriela.

TV Alagoas left the network in September 2009 and to broadcast religious programs, and SBT executive director William Stoliar sued to ensure the network's availability there. It returned to the SBT on June 1, 2010, due to viewer pressure and late rent payments by religious programs.

In February 2014 the Communist Party of Brazil sends to the Federal Government a questioning, for which he cut around 75 million dollars in advertising the broadcaster, because of criticism that the journalist Rachel Sheherazade makes against the Government.

2020s 
While the network at large suffered from the effects of the COVID pandemic in the country, it found a renewed calling in sports. One after the other, the network pursued new sporting investments when it snagged the broadcasting rights for the Campeonato Carioca 2020 grand final, followed by a renewed commitment to the Copa Liberatores for the 2020-22 period. In 2021, left and right came contracts after contracts for sports broadcasts with SBT getting the nod as broadcaster to the 2021 Copa America, and a number of arena football and futsal events - a first in network history as SBT marked its 40th anniversary. Buoyed by the sporting successes against the competition the network revived its sports newscasts: Arena SBT, which originally premiered in 2014, returned in 2020, followed by the launch the following year of SBT Sports.

Stations

SBT staff

Hosts

 Silvio Santos
 Arlindo Grund
 Arnaldo Saccomani
 Beto Marden
 Boris Feldman
 Carlos Alberto de Nóbrega
 Carlos Miranda
 Celso Portiolli
 Christina Rocha
 Cris Poli
 Cyz Zamorano
 Danilo Gentili
 David Brazil
 Diogo Lafiandre
 Eliana
 Emilio Camanzi
 Helen Ganzarolli
 Isabella Fiorentino
 Lígia Mendes
 Luís Ricardo
 Lusca Pacheco
 Maísa Silva
 Marcos Conceição
 Marília Gabriela
 Michelle Cavalcanti
 Mônica Veloso
 Nelson Nakamura
 Patrícia Abravanel
 Patrícia Salvador
 Priscilla Alcântara
 Ratinho
 Richard Rasmussen
 Ruy Varella
 Thomas Roth
 Yudi Tamashiro
 Zé Américo
 Raul Gil
 Gustavo Sibilio Borges

Reporters

 Analice Nicolau
 Carlos Nascimento
 Carolina Aguaiadas
 Cynthia Benini
 Hermano Henning
 Joyce Ribeiro
 Karyn Bravo
 Neila Medeiros   
 Patrícia Vasconcellos
 Rachel Sheherazade
 Roberto Cabrini

Artists

 Alexandre Porpetone
 Ana Carolina Lima
 Andréa de Nóbrega
 Bananinha
 Bruno Gradim
 Buiú
 Carla Marins
 Carlinhos Aguiar
 Carlos Dias
 Clarisse Abujamra
 Cláudio Lins
 Clayton Silva
 Daniel Uemura
 Durão
 Edu Martins
 Edney Giovenazzi
 Ênio Vivona
 Erom Cordeiro
 Etty Fraser
 Giovane
 Gisele Fraga
 Greta Antoine
 Helena Xavier
 João Acaiabe
 Joana Limaverde
 Jorge Loredo
 Jussara Freire
 Lígia Fagundes
 Lívia Andrade
 Lucélia Santos
 Lucia Alves
 Luciana Vendramini
 Magela
 Maria Cláudia
 Márcia Kaplun
 Maurício Manfrini
 Moacyr Franco
 Mônica Carvalho
 Mila Ribeiro
 Nany People
 Nilton Bicudo
 Oscar Pardini
 Otávio Mendes
 Patrícia de Jesus
 Paulo Pioli
 Rapadura
 Renata Ricci
 Renata Takahashi
 Rêne Loureiro
 René Vanorden
 Roberto Arduim
 Rony Rios
 Rubens Caribé
 Saulo Laranjeira
 Tainá Müller
 Thaís Pacholek
 Toni Garrido
 Tuca Laranjeira
 Velson D'Souza

Writers

 Anamaria Nunes
 Ecila Pedroso
 Íris Abravanel
 Jacqueline Vargas
 Renata Dias Gomes
 Ronaldo Ciambroni
 Solange Castro Neves
 Tiago Santiago
 Vicente Sesso
 Yoya Wursch
 Miguel Paiva

Directors

 Aldrin Mazzei (Esquadrão da Moda)
 Ariel Jacobowitz (Hebe)
 Célia Trevisan (Show do Milhão)
 Del Rangel (General Director for Drama)
 Juliana Soares (Bom Dia e Cia and Carrossel Animado)
 Leonor Corrêa (Eliana (SBT))
 Marcos Ramos (Você se Lembra?)
 Marlene Matos (Show da Gente)
 Melissa Ribeiro (Casos de Família)
 Michael Utksin (Teleton and Nada Além da Verdade)
 Ocimar de Castro (Qual é o Seu Talento?) (auditions)
 Paulo Franco (Um Contra Cem)
 Paulo Nicolau National Director for Journalism, SBT News Directorate
 Rafael Belo (Casos de Família)
 Ricardo Mantoanelli (Qual é o Seu Talento?)
 Ricardo Perez (Super Nanny and 10 Anos Mais Jovem)
 Roberto Manzoni (Domingo Legal)
 Silvia Abravanel (Sábado Animado and Domingo Animado)
 Walter Scaramuzzi (Programa do Ratinho and Teleton)
 Gustavo Sibilio Borges (Gustavo no mundo da Imaginaçao)

Programs

History of programming
The SBT has most of its schedule dedicated to programming for children and pre-teens, and it is a popular network with young audiences. In 1998 it ran the longest children's programming block in Brazilian TV history with TV Cultura, from Sessão Desenho (a cartoon block) at 7:00 AM (after the morning newscast) until 9:00 PM (when the children's telenovela Chiquititas ended). The SBT promoted the 14-hour block as "SBT Kids".

While most TV stations in Brazil depend on domestic productions, the SBT relies on imports (mainly from Mexico and the US). Since 1984, El Chavo del Ocho (shown in Brazil as Chaves) is one of the station's most popular programs. The network had until 2014 an agreement with Warner Brothers, giving it an exclusivity deal for its sitcoms, dramas and films.

Mexican telenovelas have been a staple on the SBT, reaching their peak during the early 1990s with the child-oriented Carrusel, La usurpadora, El Privilegio de Amar and Luz Clarita and the popular "María trilogy" (María Mercedes, Marimar and María la del Barrio). Compared to subdued Brazilian telenovelas, Mexican soaps are considered tacky and exaggerated.

Other 1990s hits included Domingo Legal (Cool Sunday) (a Sunday variety show which was the SBT's highest-rated program, surpassing TV Globo), and the network was the most popular channel in Brazil for hours at a stretch. Domingo Legal was criticized for its sensationalism, and its ratings began to fall after the Primeiro Comando da Capital (PCC) scandal (see below); the show often ranks second in the ratings. Other popular programs included Programa do Ratinho (Ratinho's Show, with a similar format to The Jerry Springer Show), Show do Milhão (The Million Show, similar to Who Wants to be a Millionaire?), Topa Tudo por Dinheiro (Variety show large audience that was aired on Sunday night between 1991 to 2001), Fantasia (Entertainment program where people could play games by phoning the program in order to earn money), and the Brazilian version of the Argentinean soap opera Chiquititas, popular with children.

For over 20 years the SBT held second place in the Brazilian television ratings (behind Rede Globo), but in February 2007 it was outpaced by Rede Record for the first time in São Paulo. However, after a period of resurgence which started in 2011, SBT successfully overtook Record for second place in June 2014.

Since their 1990s peak in popularity, Mexican telenovelas have been steadily declining in the ratings; the last popular Mexican soap operas were Carita de Ángel in the early 2000s and Rebelde in 2006. In 2001, SBT began remaking Mexican soaps with Brazilian actors. The first soaps (Picara Sonhadora and Marisol) did fairly well in the ratings; however, later soaps (Cristal, Os Ricos Também Choram and Maria Esperança, a version of the popular Maria Mercedes) were less popular.

In addition to Mexican soaps and their remakes, the channel also airs cartoons mornings and programs such as Ídolos (a Brazilian version of American Idol which later moved to TV Record), a Brazilian version of Supernanny,  a version of Deal or No Deal (presented by Silvio Santos, who also presents many network programs), talent shows and a dating show. The network also airs movies and A Praça é Nossa (a long-running, popular comedy program).

Soap operas

 Pensão da Inocência (1982)
 Destino (1982)
 A Força do Amor (1982)
 A Leoa (1982)
 Conflito (1982–1983)
 Sombras do Passado  (1983)
 Acorrentada (1983)
 A Ponte do Amor (1983)
 A Justiça de Deus (1983)
 Pecado de Amor (1983)
 Razão de Viver (1983)
 Anjo Maldito (1983)
 Vida Roubada (1983–1984)
 Meus Filhos, Minha Vida (1984–1985)
 Jerônimo (1984–1985)
 Joana (1984–1985)
 Jogo do Amor (1985)
 Uma Esperança no Ar (1985–1986)
 Cortina de Vidro (1989–1990)
 Brasileiras e Brasileiros (1990–1991)
 Alô, Doçura! (1990–1991)
 Grande Pai (1991–1992)
 A Justiça dos Homens (1993)
 Éramos Seis (1994)
 As Pupilas do Senhor Reitor (1994–1995)
 Sangue do Meu Sangue (1995–1996)
 Razão de Viver (1996)
 Colégio Brasil (1996)
 Antônio Alves, Taxista (1996)
 Brava Gente (1996–1997)
 Dona Anja (1996–1997)
 Os Ossos do Barão (1997)
 Chiquititas (1997–2001)
 Fascinação (1998)
 Teleteatro (1998–1999)
 Pérola Negra (1998–1999)
 O Direito de Nascer (2001)
 Pícara Sonhadora (2001)
 Amor e Ódio (2001–2002)
 Marisol (2002)
 Pequena Travessa (2002–2003)
 Jamais te Esquecerei (2003)
Canavial de Paixões (2003–2004)
 Seus Olhos (2004)
 Esmeralda (2004–2005)
 Os Ricos Também Choram (2005)
 Cristal (2006)
 Maria Esperança (2007)
 Amigas & Rivais (2007–2008)
 Revelação (2008–2009)
 Vende-se um Véu de Noiva (2009)
 Uma Rosa com Amor (2010)
 Amor e Revolução (2011)
 Corações Feridos (2012)
 Carrossel (2012-2013)
 Chiquititas (2013-2015)
 Cúmplices de um Resgate (2015-2016) 
 Carinha de Anjo (2016-2018)
 As Aventuras de Poliana (2018–2020)

Reality and game shows
 Bake Off Brasil
 Júnior Bake Off Brasil
 Bake Off Brasil Celebrity
 BBQ Brasil (BBQ Champ)
 Hell's Kitchen: Cozinha sob Pressão
 Roda a Roda Jequiti (Wheel of Fortune)
 Programa Silvio Santos (Takeshi's Castle)
 Passa ou Repassa (Double Dare) - (Domingo Legal)
 Show do Milhão PicPay (Game Show)
 Quem Arrisca Ganha Mais (Game Show) - (Domingo Legal)
 Comprar É Bom, Levar É Melhor (Game Show) - (Domingo Legal)
 Wall Duet Brasil (The Wall Song) - (Ratinho)
 O Melhor (The Winner Is) - (Ratinho)
 Te Devo Essa! Brasil (Property_Brothers)
 Mestres da Sabotagem (Cutthroat Kitchen)
 Ex-Maridos Contra Ex-Mulheres - (future)
 O Mais Fraco Vai Embora (Weakest Link) - (future)
 Hotel dos Artistas (El hotel de los famosos) - (future)
 Famílias Frente a Frente (Family Food Fight)
 Pra Ganhar É Só Rodar
 Fábrica de Casamentos
 Jogo das Fichas
 Nada além de Um Minuto (Minute to Win It)
 Rola ou Enrola? - (Eliana)
 Fenômenos - (Eliana)
 Esquadrão da Moda (What Not to Wear)
 Bomba! (Boom!) - (Programa Silvio Santos)
 Cabelo Pantene - O Reality (2017-2018)
 Qual é o Seu Talento? (What's Your Talent?)
 Caldeirão da Sorte (2016-2017)
 Duelo de Mães (2016-2017)
 Dance se Puder (2016) - (Eliana)
 Máquina da Fama (2013-2017)
 Esse Artista Sou Eu (Your Face Sounds Familiar) (2014)
 Os Paranormais (Psychic Challenge) (2014)
 Festival Sertanejo (2013-2014)
 Menino de Ouro (Football's Next Star) (2013-2014)
 Famoso Quem? (My Name Is) (2013)
 Amigos da Onça (Impractical Jokers) (2013)
 Vamos Brincar de Forca (2012-2013)
 Cante se Puder (Sing If You Can) (2011-2013)
 Se Ela Dança, Eu Danço (So You Think You Can Dance) (2011-2012)
 Esquadrão do Amor (2011-2012)
 Um Milhão na Mesa (The Million Pound Drop) (2011)
 Cantando no SBT (2011)
 SOS Casamento (2011)
 Romance no Escuro (Dating in the Dark) (2010-2011) - (Eliana)
 Solitários (Solitary) (2010)
 Meu Pai é Melhor que Seu Pai (My Dad Is Better Than Your Dad) (2010)
 Topa ou Não Topa (Deal or No Deal) (2006-2011)
 Um Contra Cem (1 vs. 100) (2009-2010)
 Você Se Lembra? (Amne$ia) (2009-2010)
 10 Anos Mais Jovem (10 Years Younger) (2009)
 Identidade Secreta (Identity) (2009)
 Só Falta Esposa (2009)
 Astros (2008-2013)
 Supernanny (2008-2010)
 Nada Além da Verdade (The Moment of Truth) (2008-2010)
 Quem Manda É o Chefe (2008-2009)
 High School Musical: A Seleção (2008)
 Tentação (2007-2009)
 Você É mais Esperto que um Aluno da Quinta Série? (Are You Smarter than a 5th Grader?) (2007-2008)
 Quem Perde, Ganha (The Biggest Loser) (2007)
 Vinte e Um (Twenty One) (2007)
 Namoro na TV (The Dating Game) (2007)
 Curtindo com Reais (2007)
 Curtindo com Crianças (2007)
 Você É o Jurado (2007)
 Ídolos (SBT) (Idols) (2006-2007)
 Bailando por um Sonho (2006)
 Family Feud Brasil (Family Feud) (2005-2006)
 Casamento à Moda Antiga (2005-2006)
 O Grande Perdedor (2005)
 O Conquistador do Fim do Mundo (2003)
 Xaveco-Se Rolar...Rolou (Singled Out) (1996-2001-2003-2004)
 Todos contra Um (2002-2005)
 Popstars Brasil (Popstars) (2002-2003)
 Ilha da Sedução (Temptation Island) (2002-2003)
 Sete e Meio (Seven and a half) (2002)
 Curtindo uma Viagem (2001-2002)
 Casa dos Artistas (Protagonistas) (2001-2002-2004)
 Audácia (Greed) (2000)
 Qual É a Música? (The Singing Bee) (1999-2008)
 Qual é a Musica? (Name That Tune) (1999-2005)
 Show do Milhão (Million Show) (1999-2009)
 Gol Show (1997-2002)
 Nações Unidas (1992-1993)
 Cidade contra Cidade (1988-1989)
 Casa dos Segredos (Secret Story) (canceled)
 Cinquenta (50–50) (uncertainty)

References

External links

  

 
Television networks in Brazil
Television stations in Brazil
Grupo Silvio Santos
Mass media in Osasco
Television channels and stations established in 1981
Mass media companies established in 1981
1981 establishments in Brazil